The Connetquot Central School District of Islip is a school district located in the Town of Islip of Suffolk County, New York on Long Island. The district serves the entirety of the communities of Bohemia, Oakdale, and Ronkonkoma, while it serves parts of Sayville and West Sayville. Most parts of Sayville and West Sayville are zoned to the neighboring Sayville School District. There is one preschool, seven elementary schools, two middle schools, and one senior high school.

Schools
Edward J. Bosti Elementary School (PK–5) – Oakdale
Cherokee Street Elementary School (K–5) – Ronkonkoma
Helen B. Duffield Elementary School (K–5) – Ronkonkoma
Idle Hour Elementary School (K–5) – Oakdale
John Pearl Elementary School (K–5) – Bohemia
Edith L. Slocum Elementary School (K–5) – Ronkonkoma
Sycamore Avenue Elementary School (K–5) – Bohemia
Oakdale-Bohemia Middle School (6–8) – Oakdale
Ronkonkoma Middle School (6–8) – Ronkonkoma
Connetquot High School (9–12) – Bohemia

History

In 1960, with continuing suburban growth, voters in the existing Oakdale-Bohemia and Ronkonkoma school districts voted to consolidate their two districts, which paved the way for construction of a high school.

In January 1962, the entire district was shuttered for a week due to an outbreak of scarlet fever.

School Shooting Plot 
In July 2007, the school district received national attention when two teenagers who attended Connetquot High School were arrested for planning an attack on the school in the Connetquot High School Plot. The plans reportedly included a hit list of students and staff and how to ignite explosives. According to a local radio station website, students interviewed said that they were not surprised of the arrests because of the many bomb scares in the 2006–2007 school year.

References

External links
Connetquot Central School District Webpage

School districts in New York (state)
Education in Suffolk County, New York
School districts established in 1963